Jazz Is Dead may refer to

Jazz Is Dead (band): a Grateful Dead instrumental cover band
Jazz Is Dead (record label): a Los Angeles record label and recording series